Demon Knights is a DC Comics title launched in 2011 as part of that company's line-wide title relaunch, The New 52. It is a team title featuring Etrigan, Madame Xanadu, Shining Knight and others. Its main difference to other team titles, such as the Justice League, is that this team is based in the Medieval period of the DC Universe history. Its initial writer is Paul Cornell, with art by Diogenes Neves.

Publication history
In the planning stages of The New 52, Paul Cornell was asked to write an Etrigan title. At his request this became a team title set in Medieval times as this was of more interest to him, and a more fitting period for Etrigan to operate. Cornell also stated that a love of the film The Magnificent Seven is an influence on the title, and that it is a team title as he is more interested in the interactions between characters, rather than any scene or period. It has been confirmed that this team is the ancestral version of Stormwatch.

Characters
 Etrigan - A demon, bonded to a human magician, Jason Blood. The character was originally created by Jack Kirby.
 Lucifer - A fallen angel and the ruler of Hell.
 Madame Xanadu - A powerful magician, with ties to Merlin.
 Vandal Savage - An immortal man, and regular villain in the DC Universe.
 Shining Knight - A knight called Sir Ystin, from fallen Camelot.
 The Horsewoman - A mysterious woman never seen off her horse.
 Al Jabr - A Middle Eastern fighter and tactician, with a good knowledge of mathematics.
 Exoristos - A strange woman with ties to the Amazons.

Plot
The first arc opens with Jason Blood and Madame Xanadu arriving at the town of Little Spring. While in the local tavern, they find themselves among the likes of Vandal Savage, Sir Ystin, Al Jabr, and Exoristos. Outside the town, the impending horde of The Questing Queen and Mordru composed of barbarians, magically enchanted dinosaurs, and mechanical man-powered dragons is heading towards the town. The Queen wishes to go through Little Spring to reach the rich city of Alba Sarum and take it by surprise. When the horde meets resistance from the heroes, the Queen decides the only choice of action is to contain and destroy the town. Vandal tells the villagers that the only means of survival is to evacuate, having once served in the Questing Queen's horde. To save the town from an oncoming fireball, Xanadu creates a magical barrier sealing Little Spring inside and out until sunrise. The Horsewoman is able to get through the barrier and heads to warn Alba Sarum and bring reinforcements. As the heroes and villagers prepare for the battle to come, Sir Ystin receives a vision from Merlin. He reveals to Ystin the source of his immortality and his yearning to seek the holy grail. Merlin also explains that Camelot itself is a city which is reincarnated over the centuries, meaning to be the best of humanity but always falling before its time. Vandal defects to the Queen, escaping Little Spring by an underground passage, and is made general for her forces. Finally day breaks, and Xanadu's barrier falls. The result is a brutal slaughter of the villagers of Little Spring. Vandal reveals his real intentions were to capture the horde's supply lines for himself but is discovered by the Queen. She opens fire on her own forces which causes routing and chaos. The forces of Alba Sarum arrive and force the Questing Queen to retreat but Little Spring and its people are devastated.

After the battle, the group is summoned by the Princesses Alba and Sarum. They have built their city in the hopes of creating a new Camelot and even had Merlin aiding them. Yet Merlin himself was mysteriously murdered and without his help, the princesses are unable to fulfill their promise of creating a new Camelot and will be unable to marry. Xanadu explains that the only means of resurrecting Merlin is to retrieve his soul from Avalon. The princesses give them a ship and weapons to travel to Britain and find a way into Avalon. Meanwhile, Etrigan plans with his master, Lucifer, to take Avalon for themselves. After a battle with pirates while crossing the English Channel, the heroes arrive in Britain which has been recently plagued by giant ravenous animals. They track the source of the monsters to the abandoned ruins of Camelot. The only remaining structure is now an eerie tower which beams sickly green light. The heroes are then attacked by an undead incarnation of King Arthur as the light turns all of the Demon Knights into monsters which resemble their darkest desires save for Madame Xanadu. The undead King Arthur leads them to a cave where he uses the waters of Camelot to revert their transformations. With the help of the Demon Knights, Arthur leads an assault on the tower. As they enter, it is revealed that the source of the dark magic about the ruins is the work of Morgaine le Fey. Morgaine captures King Arthur and the Demon Knights and explains that she plans to use them as sacrifices to leave her own decrepit form and possess Merlin's. After escaping, the heroes confront Morgaine but she uses her magic to possess Arthur instead. With his last ounce of strength, Arthur destroys the magical center of the tower and brings it crumbling down. While Morgaine is stopped, the knights are unable to find passage into Avalon and an enraged Etrigan sends them all to Hell.

In hell, the Demon Knights are faced with their own individual torments as Lucifer and Etrigan plan their next move. Exoristos's torment is to be chained to the shores of Themyscira, unable to reach it. Lucifer appears before her and offers her release if she carries a black diamond back to Earth. This leaves Jason Blood behind in the ruins of Camelot and prepares to enter Hell to save Xanadu until he is interrupted by the Questing Queen. The Queen makes a deal with Jason to force the swap between him and Etrigan so that he may rescue Xanadu. Meanwhile, Sir Ystin breaks free from his torment and begins rescuing the other Demon Knights and they make plans to escape to Avalon with Merlin's body. Meanwhile, both the Questing Queen and Lucifer make plans to invade Avalon and take it for themselves. It's during this that Sir Ystin explains to Exoristos, after she tries to make a pass at him, that he is "not just a man or a woman.  [He is] both". The heroes finally make their way to Avalon but are attacked by Avalon's forces as well as those of Lucifer and the Questing Queen. A massive battle between the forces of Earth, Heaven, and Hell erupts as King Arthur appears with his knights from across the ages. Merlin is slowly rejuvenated by the magic of Avalon and tells them to create rain which Al Jabr provides. The rain of Avalon weakens Lucifer's demons and cleanses the enchantments on the Queen's dinosaurs. With both forces defeated, the Demon Knights are victorious and Merlin dubs them the first incarnation of Stormwatch. On their return to Earth, the Demon Knights go their separate ways.

Thirty years later, the Demon Knights are brought together again by an aged Al Jabr (being the only non-immortal). He says that the vampire Cain is making his way across Europe with a horde of vampires and plans to turn the warriors of Themyscira into his own unstoppable undead army. The Demon Knights finally reunite but are too late as Cain's forces set sail towards Themyscira. Using Xanadu's magic, the knights create a makeshift raft and help the Amazons in repelling Cain. However, Sir Ystin believes this battle will mark him being turned into a vampire as told to him by his vision.  Though they manage to defeat Cain, Ystin is bitten.

Reception
The first issue was the 72nd best selling comic by units in September 2011. The series opened to positive reviews, with scores around 8 or 9 from IGN's comics section for the first few issues, with writer Erik Norris' entreating readers to read this title: "People, Demon Knights is awesome. Please join the bandwagon and give this fun book a shot if you haven't already. You won't regret it. A series like this needs all the support it can get to keep it from getting the axe". Popmatters compared Paul Cornell's retro-modern style to a DJ, mixing the RZA and Miles Davis.

Collected editions
 Demon Knights Vol. 1: Seven Against the Dark (collects Demon Knights #1-7)
 Demon Knights Vol. 2: The Avalon Trap (collects Demon Knights #8-12 and #0)
 Demon Knights Vol. 3: The Gathering Storm (collects Demon Knights #13-23)

See also
 Etrigan the Demon

References

2011 comics debuts
2013 comics endings
DC Comics titles
Comics set in the Middle Ages
Fiction about the Devil